The women's 200 metres event at the 2013 Summer Universiade was held on 9–10 July.

Medalists

Results

Heats
Qualification: First 3 in each heat and 6 best performers advance to the Semifinals.

Wind:Heat 1: -0.6 m/s, Heat 2: +0.9 m/s, Heat 3: -0.7 m/s, Heat 4: +0.2 m/s, Heat 5: -0.1 m/s, Heat 6: +0.4 m/s

Semifinals
Qualification: First 2 in each heat and 2 best performers advanced to the final.

Wind:Heat 1: +3.0 m/s, Heat 2: +2.0 m/s, Heat 3: +1.7 m/s

Final
Wind: +1.6 m/s

References 

200
2013 in women's athletics
2013